Magnes may refer to:

 Magnes (son of Aeolus), in Greek mythology, the eponym and first king of Magnesia
 Magnes (son of Argos), in Greek mythology, son of Argos and Perimele, and father of Hymenaeus
 Magnes the shepherd, possibly mythological, cited as the discoverer of natural magnetism
 Magnes (comic poet) (5th century BC), Athenian victor of the Dionysia festival
 Macarius Magnes (4th century), bishop of Magnesia
 Judah Leon Magnes (1877–1948), reform rabbi in the United States and Palestine, first President of the Hebrew University of Jerusalem
 Magnes (album), by Reni Jusis

See also
 Magnes (mythology)
 Magness (disambiguation)
 Magnus (disambiguation)